Sylvester Williams Jr. (born November 21, 1988) is a former American football defensive end. He was drafted by the Broncos in the first round of the 2013 NFL Draft. He played college football at North Carolina, where he earned All-American honors.

Early years
Williams was born in St Louis, Missouri, into a family with three older sisters and one younger brother.
He attended Jefferson City High School, and played football for only one season in high school, and started only one game.  Not being recruited by college programs, he assembled radiator parts for large combines before deciding to walk-on at Coffeyville Community College.  He had 52 tackles and two sacks in 2010.

College career
Williams transferred to the University of North Carolina at Chapel Hill in 2011, and played for the North Carolina Tar Heels football team in 2011 and 2012.  As a junior in 2011, he had 43 tackles and 2.5 sacks. The following season, Williams was named to the All-ACC first team. He was also named an All-American by Pro Football Weekly.

Professional career
Coming out of North Carolina, Williams was a projected first round pick by the majority of NFL draft experts and analysts. He attended the NFL combine and completed all of the required combine and positional drills. On March 26, 2013, Williams participated at North Carolina's pro day, along with Jonathan Cooper, Giovani Bernard, Brennan Williams, Travis Bond, Kevin Reddick, and nine other teammates, and opted to only perform positional drills for scouts and team representatives in attendance. Williams was ranked the fourth best defensive tackle prospect in the draft by NFLDraftScout.com, NFL analyst Mike Mayock, and Sports Illustrated (behind Sharrif Floyd, Sheldon Richardson, and Star Lotulelei).

Denver Broncos
The Denver Broncos selected Williams in the first round (28th overall pick) of the 2013 NFL Draft. He recorded his first career sack on December 12, 2013 in a loss to the San Diego Chargers. He had another sack the following week against the Houston Texans. On December 29, Oakland Raiders quarterback Terrelle Pryor bobbled a snap and Williams recovered it. As a rookie in 2013, Williams played 13 games with 22 tackles, 2 sacks, and a fumble recovery. The Broncos finished the season with a 13-3 record, clinching an AFC West and home field advantage throughout the playoffs, but lost to the Seattle Seahawks by a score of 43-8 in Super Bowl XLVIII.

In the 2014 season, Williams played all 16 games, started 13 of them, making 22 tackles and a pass defended. The Broncos finished with a 12-4 record, clinching the 2nd seed and another AFC West pennant, but were defeated 24-13 by the Indianapolis Colts in the AFC Divisional Round.

In the 2015 season, Williams started 15 games with 25 tackles and 2.5 sacks. The Broncos finished the season with a 12-4 record, clinching another AFC West pennant. The Broncos defense was ranked #1 in the NFL in the 2015 year. On February 7, 2016, Williams was part of the Broncos team that won Super Bowl 50. In the game, the Broncos defeated the Carolina Panthers by a score of 24–10. In the Super Bowl, Williams recorded two tackles and defended a pass. The Broncos won the game by a score of 24–10, giving Williams his first career championship title after defeating the Carolina Panthers. It was also the first time in 17 years and third time in franchise history the Broncos won the Super Bowl.

Tennessee Titans
On March 10, 2017, Williams signed a three-year contract with the Tennessee Titans.

On March 17, 2018, Williams was released by the Titans.

Detroit Lions
On March 21, 2018, Williams signed a one-year contract with the Detroit Lions. He played in six games with four starts before being released on October 25, 2018.

Miami Dolphins
On October 31, 2018, Williams was signed by the Miami Dolphins.

New Orleans Saints
On May 13, 2019, Williams signed with the New Orleans Saints. He was released on August 31, 2019.

Los Angeles Chargers
On October 23, 2019, Williams was signed by the Los Angeles Chargers.

Denver Broncos (second stint)
On October 3, 2020, Williams was signed to the Denver Broncos practice squad. He was promoted to the active roster on October 17, 2020. He was released on October 23, and re-signed to the practice squad the next day. He was promoted back to the active roster on October 27.

References

External links
Denver Broncos bio
North Carolina Tar Heels bio

1988 births
Living people
All-American college football players
American football defensive tackles
Denver Broncos players
Detroit Lions players
Los Angeles Chargers players
Miami Dolphins players
New Orleans Saints players
North Carolina Tar Heels football players
Players of American football from Missouri
Sportspeople from Jefferson City, Missouri
Tennessee Titans players